Dolichoderus is a genus of ants found worldwide.

Taxonomy
The ants of the Neotropical genus Monacis were revised in 1959 by Kempf. However, Brown in 1973 and G. C. Wheeler and J. Wheeler in 1973 and 1976 considered both Monacis and Hypoclinea to be junior synonyms of Dolichoderus.

Description
The type species is Dolichoderus attelaboides. Worker ants in this genus have a body length that is typically about four millimetres and can be recognised by their thick, inflexible and strongly sculptured integument. There is a flange on the underside of the head near the base of the mandibles which is saw-like in some species. The longitudinal suture in the central plate of the metathorax is deeply impressed. The propodeum or first abdominal segment has the posterior face distinctly concave when viewed from the side. The gaster and alitrunk are separated by a single segment, the petiole. The orifice of the cloaca is a horizontal slit rather than a circular opening. It is surrounded by a few rather stiff erect bristles.

Distribution
Members of this genus are found worldwide, in all the continents except Antarctica.

Biology
Colonies are of varying sizes and are constructed in the soil, in curled leaves, in the hollow stems of plants and in cartons which are formed by the ants chewing wood and mixing the product with secretions in a similar way to that used by wasps to build their nests.  Some species are very versatile with Dolichoderus pustulatus nesting underground in northern parts of the United States while living wholly in trees in the south. The workers seek out and tend sap-sucking insects such as aphids and scale insects that excrete honeydew and they also feed on small arthropods. Some species emit a pungent smelling fluid. Two species, Dolichoderus plagiatus and Dolichoderus taschenbergi, are believed to be polygynous with several queens in one nest. It is also possible that D. taschenbergi may be a temporary social parasite with D. plagiatus as host.

Species

Dolichoderus abruptus (Smith, 1858)
†Dolichoderus affectus Théobald, 1937
Dolichoderus affinis Emery, 1889
Dolichoderus albamaculus Shattuck & Marsden, 2013
Dolichoderus andinus (Kempf, 1962)
Dolichoderus angusticornis Clark, 1930
†Dolichoderus antiquus Carpenter, 1930
Dolichoderus attelaboides (Fabricius, 1775)
Dolichoderus australis André, 1896
Dolichoderus baenae MacKay, 1993
†Dolichoderus balticus (Mayr, 1868)
Dolichoderus beccarii Emery, 1887
Dolichoderus bidens (Linnaeus, 1758)
Dolichoderus bispinosus (Olivier, 1792)
†Dolichoderus brevicornis Dlussky, 2002
†Dolichoderus brevipalpis Dlussky, 2008
†Dolichoderus brevipennis Dlussky, 2008
Dolichoderus brevis Santschi, 1920
Dolichoderus brevithorax Menozzi, 1928
†Dolichoderus bruneti Théobald, 1937
Dolichoderus burmanicus Bingham, 1903
Dolichoderus butteli Forel, 1913
Dolichoderus canopus Shattuck & Marsden, 2013
Dolichoderus carbonarius Emery, 1895
†Dolichoderus caribbaeus (Wilson, 1985)
Dolichoderus clarki Wheeler, 1935
Dolichoderus clusor Forel, 1907
Dolichoderus cogitans Forel, 1912
Dolichoderus coniger (Mayr, 1870)
†Dolichoderus coquandi Théobald, 1937
†Dolichoderus cornutus (Mayr, 1868)
Dolichoderus crawleyi Donisthorpe, 1917
Dolichoderus curvilobus (Lattke, 1987)
Dolichoderus cuspidatus (Smith, 1857)
Dolichoderus dajiensis Wang & Zheng, 2005
Dolichoderus debilis Emery, 1890
Dolichoderus decollatus Smith, 1858
Dolichoderus dentatus Forel, 1902
†Dolichoderus dibolius Wilson, 1985
Dolichoderus diversus Emery, 1894
†Dolichoderus dlusskyi LaPolla & Greenwalt, 2015
Dolichoderus doloniger (Roger, 1862)
Dolichoderus doriae Emery, 1887
†Dolichoderus elegans Wheeler, 1915
Dolichoderus epetreius (Lattke, 1987)
Dolichoderus erectilobus Santschi, 1920
Dolichoderus etus Shattuck & Marsden, 2013
†Dolichoderus evolans Zhang, 1989
†Dolichoderus explicans (Förster, 1891)
Dolichoderus extensispinus Forel, 1915
Dolichoderus feae Emery, 1889
Dolichoderus fernandezi MacKay, 1993
Dolichoderus ferrugineus Forel, 1903
Dolichoderus flatidorsus Zhou & Zheng, 1997
Dolichoderus formosus Clark, 1930
Dolichoderus furcifer Emery, 1887
Dolichoderus gagates Emery, 1890
Dolichoderus germaini Emery, 1894
Dolichoderus ghilianii Emery, 1894
Dolichoderus gibbifer Emery, 1887
Dolichoderus gibbus (Smith, 1861)
Dolichoderus gordoni Shattuck & Marsden, 2013
Dolichoderus goudiei Clark, 1930
†Dolichoderus granulinotus Dlussky, 2008
Dolichoderus haradae MacKay, 1993
†Dolichoderus heeri Dlussky & Putyatina, 2014
Dolichoderus imitator Emery, 1894
Dolichoderus incisus Xu, 1995
Dolichoderus indrapurensis Forel, 1912
Dolichoderus inermis MacKay, 1993
Dolichoderus inferus Shattuck & Marsden, 2013
Dolichoderus inpai (Harada, 1987)
†Dolichoderus intermedius MacKay, 1993
Dolichoderus jacobsoni Forel, 1909
†Dolichoderus jiaoyanshanensis (Hong, 1985)
Dolichoderus kathae Shattuck & Marsden, 2013
Dolichoderus kinabaluensis Dill, 2002
†Dolichoderus kohlsi Dlussky & Rasnitsyn, 2003
†Dolichoderus kutscheri Dlussky, 2008
†Dolichoderus kutschlinicus (Deichmüller, 1881)
†Dolichoderus lacinius Zhang, 1989
Dolichoderus lactarius (Smith, 1860)
Dolichoderus lamellosus (Mayr, 1870)
Dolichoderus laminatus (Mayr, 1870)
Dolichoderus laotius Santschi, 1920
Dolichoderus laurae MacKay, 1993
Dolichoderus lobicornis (Kempf, 1959)
Dolichoderus longicollis MacKay, 1993
†Dolichoderus longipennis (Mayr, 1868)
†Dolichoderus longipilosus Dlussky, 2002
†Dolichoderus lucidus Dlussky, 2008
Dolichoderus luederwaldti Santschi, 1921
Dolichoderus lugens Emery, 1894
Dolichoderus lujae Santschi, 1923
†Dolichoderus luridivenosus Zhang, Sun & Zhang, 1994
Dolichoderus lutosus (Smith, 1858)
Dolichoderus magnipastor Dill, 2002
Dolichoderus mariae Forel, 1885
Dolichoderus maschwitzi Dill, 2002
Dolichoderus mesonotalis Forel, 1907
†Dolichoderus mesosternalis Wheeler, 1915
Dolichoderus modiglianii Emery, 1900
Dolichoderus moggridgei Forel, 1886
Dolichoderus monoceros Emery, 1897
Dolichoderus mucronifer (Roger, 1862)
†Dolichoderus nanus Dlussky, 2002
Dolichoderus niger Crawley, 1922
Dolichoderus nigricornis Clark, 1930
†Dolichoderus obliteratus (Scudder, 1877)
Dolichoderus omacanthus (Kempf, 1972)
Dolichoderus omicron Shattuck & Marsden, 2013
†Dolichoderus oviformis Théobald, 1937
Dolichoderus parvus Clark, 1930
†Dolichoderus passalomma Wheeler, 1915
Dolichoderus pastorulus Dill, 2002
Dolichoderus patens (Mayr, 1870)
†Dolichoderus perkovskyi Dlussky, 2008
Dolichoderus piceus MacKay, 1993
Dolichoderus pilinomas Dill, 2002
†Dolichoderus pilipes Dlussky, 2008
Dolichoderus pilosus Zhou & Zheng, 1997
†Dolichoderus pinguis Dlussky, Rasnitsyn, & Perfilieva, 2015
Dolichoderus plagiatus (Mayr, 1870)
†Dolichoderus polessus Dlussky, 2002
†Dolichoderus polonicus Dlussky, 2002
†Dolichoderus primitivus (Wilson, 1985)
†Dolichoderus prolaminatus (Wilson, 1985)
†Dolichoderus punctatus Dlussky, 2008
Dolichoderus pustulatus Mayr, 1886
Dolichoderus quadridenticulatus (Roger, 1862)
Dolichoderus quadripunctatus (Linnaeus, 1771)
Dolichoderus reflexus Clark, 1930
†Dolichoderus robustus Dlussky, 2002
†Dolichoderus rohweri Carpenter, 1930
Dolichoderus rosenbergi Forel, 1911
Dolichoderus rufescens Mann, 1912
Dolichoderus rufotibialis Clark, 1930
Dolichoderus rugocapitus Zhou, 2001
Dolichoderus rugosus (Smith, 1858)
Dolichoderus rutilus Shattuck & Marsden, 2013
Dolichoderus sagmanotus Xu, 2001
Dolichoderus satanus Bolton, 1995
Dolichoderus scabridus Roger, 1862
Dolichoderus schulzi Emery, 1894
Dolichoderus scrobiculatus (Mayr, 1876)
†Dolichoderus sculpturatus (Mayr, 1868)
Dolichoderus semiorbis Shattuck & Marsden, 2013
Dolichoderus semirugosus (Mayr, 1870)
Dolichoderus septemspinosus Emery, 1894
Dolichoderus setosus (Kempf, 1959)
Dolichoderus shattucki MacKay, 1993
Dolichoderus sibiricus Emery, 1889
Dolichoderus siggii Forel, 1895
Dolichoderus smithi MacKay, 1993
Dolichoderus spinicollis (Latreille, 1817)
Dolichoderus spurius Forel, 1903
Dolichoderus squamanodus Xu, 2001
Dolichoderus sulcaticeps (Mayr, 1870)
Dolichoderus sundari Mathew & Tiwari, 2000
Dolichoderus superaculus (Lattke, 1987)
Dolichoderus taprobanae (Smith, 1858)
Dolichoderus taschenbergi (Mayr, 1866)
†Dolichoderus tauricus Dlussky, 1981
†Dolichoderus tertiarius (Mayr, 1868)
Dolichoderus thoracicus (Smith, 1860)
†Dolichoderus transversipetiolaris Zhang, Sun & Zhang, 1994
Dolichoderus tricolor Emery, 1914
Dolichoderus tricornis Emery, 1897
Dolichoderus tridentanodus Ortega-De Santiago & Vásquez-Bolaños, 2012
Dolichoderus tristis Mann, 1916
Dolichoderus tuberifer Emery, 1887
Dolichoderus turneri Forel, 1902
Dolichoderus validus (Kempf, 1959)
Dolichoderus varians Mann, 1916
†Dolichoderus vectensis Donisthorpe, 1920
†Dolichoderus vexillarius Wheeler, 1915
†Dolichoderus vlaskini Dlussky, 2008
Dolichoderus voraginosus MacKay, 1993
Dolichoderus ypsilon Forel, 1902
†Dolichoderus zherichini Dlussky & Perkovsky, 2002

References

External links

 
Dolichoderinae
Ant genera
Taxa described in 1831